City of Spires is a Big Finish Productions audio drama based on the long-running British science fiction television series Doctor Who.

Plot
In the Scottish Highlands, Black Donald is fighting the Redcoats to halt the Clearances.  But time itself seems to be confused.  And the mysterious Red Cap has built anachronistic machines that are extracting the blood of the land.

Cast
The Doctor – Colin Baker
Jamie McCrimmon – Frazer Hines
Alice – Georgia Tennant
Victor – Richard Earl
Major Heyward – James Albrecht
Sergeant Rilke – Russell Floyd
Guthrie – Sam Graham
Rob – Charlie Ross
Red Cap – John Banks

Continuity
City of Spires is followed by the Companion Chronicles story Night's Black Agents, with the Doctor and Jamie still in Scotland.  Some elements, such as the mention of "the man of your god" (Reverend Merodach), are foreshadowing for this next tale.
Jamie McCrimmon was originally a companion of the Second Doctor, until the Time Lords returned him to Scotland and erased his memories of travelling in the TARDIS (but retained their initial adventure, The Highlanders).  The Sixth Doctor previously encountered Jamie on screen in The Two Doctors (while still with the Second Doctor).
Jamie briefly had his memories restored by a Time Lord in the Companion Chronicles story The Glorious Revolution, but ultimately chose to have them erased again.
Jamie's vision of the "Phantom Piper" (actually a Cyberman) occurred in The Moonbase.
The Doctor's line about the assembled hordes of Genghis Khan not being able to break into the TARDIS is also what the Ninth Doctor told Rose Tyler in the first episode of the revived TV series "Rose".
The black water is seen again in The Wreck of the Titan and Legend of the Cybermen, where its secrets are revealed.
This story arc concludes in Legend of the Cybermen, which also reveals the origin of the aliens in City of Spires.

Cast Notes
Georgia Moffett, daughter of Peter Davison and wife of David Tennant, was in the 2000 Doctor Who audio story Red Dawn, alongside her father as the Fifth Doctor.  In 2008, she was in the Doctor Who TV story "The Doctor's Daughter", in the titular role, Jenny.  She also voiced a role in the 2009 Doctor Who animated story Dreamland.

External links
City of Spires

2010 audio plays
Sixth Doctor audio plays
Scotland in fiction